Anđelko Savić (born 11 March 1993) is a Swiss professional footballer of Serbian descent who plays for FC Bavois as a forward in the Swiss Promotion League.

Club career
In 2011, he joined  Sampdoria from Basel.  He also holds Serbian passport. He made his debut against Siena.

On 23 August 2013, Savić signed a loan deal with buying option with Sheffield Wednesday. On 21 December 2013, he made his debut as a 66th-minute substitute in a 2-1 home loss to AFC Bournemouth.

Savić signed a season long loan deal with Swiss Challenge League side Lausanne Sport on 2 July 2014. He made his debut as a second-half substitute in the season opener against FC Lugano on 19 July.

On 25 June 2015, he joined Swiss Challenge League side Neuchâtel Xamax on a free transfer.

Ahead of the 2019/20 season, Savić joined Swiss Promotion League club FC Bavois.

International career
He is capped at various youth levels for Switzerland, ranging from U15 to U21.

Career statistics

Club

References

Living people
1993 births
Association football forwards
Swiss men's footballers
Sportspeople from Lausanne
Swiss people of Serbian descent
U.C. Sampdoria players
Sheffield Wednesday F.C. players
FC Lausanne-Sport players
FC Le Mont players
FC Wil players
Neuchâtel Xamax FCS players
Swiss expatriate footballers
Expatriate footballers in Italy
Expatriate footballers in England
Serie A players
English Football League players
Swiss Challenge League players
Swiss Promotion League players
Switzerland youth international footballers
Switzerland under-21 international footballers